Shadowdance is the third studio album by new-age group Shadowfax, the second for Windham Hill Records.

Track listing
 "New Electric India" (G. E. Stinson) – 5:12
 "Watercourse Way" (Chuck Greenberg, Stinson) – 5:06
 "Ghost Bird" (Stinson) – 5:04
 "Shadowdance" (Greenberg) – 5:20
 "Brown Rice/Karmapa Chenno" (Don Cherry) – 4:18
 "Distant Voices" (Stinson, Greenberg) – 3:46
 "A Song for My Brother" (Stinson) – 9:04

Personnel
G. E. Stinson – 6- and 12-string guitar, vocal on 5
Chuck Greenberg – Lyricon, tenor saxophone, flute
Phil Maggini – bass
Stuart Nevitt – drums, percussion, vibraphone
Jared Stewart – piano synthesizers
Jamii Szmadzinski – violin, baritone violin, alto psaltry

Additional personnel
Emil Richards – gamelan gongs on 4, bass flapamba on 4, metal and bamboo angklung on 4, wood block, marimba on 4, Chinese water cymbals on 1, kangjeera on 1, percussion conductor on 4
Michael Spiro – conga on 5, shekere on 5, guiro on 5, hand percussion on 2 5
Michael Lehocky – percussion on 4 5
Adam Rudolph – tabla on 5

Charts

References

Shadowfax (band) albums
1983 albums
Windham Hill Records albums